De Vries is one of the most common Dutch surnames. It indicates a geographical origin: "Vriesland" is an old spelling of the Dutch province of Friesland (Frisia). Hence, "de Vries" means "the Frisian". The name has been modified to "DeVries", "deVries", or "Devries" in other countries.

People named De Vries:

Academics
 Barend de Vries (1925–2010) – Dutch economist at the World Bank
 Benjamin de Vries (born 1923) – Dutch-Israeli economic historian
 Gerda de Vries, Canadian mathematician
 Glen de Vries
 Gustav de Vries (1866–1934) – Dutch mathematician
 Hans de Vries (born 1927) – Dutch economic historian
 Hent de Vries (born 1958) – Dutch philosopher
 Hessel de Vries (1916–1959) – Dutch physicist
 Hugo de Vries (1848–1935) – Dutch botanist and geneticist
 Jan de Vries (linguist) (1890–1964) – Dutch Germanic mythologist
 Jan de Vries (historian) (1943) – (Dutch-)American historian
 Jouke de Vries (born 1960) – Dutch University Dean
 Jurn de Vries (born 1940) – Dutch theologian and journalist
 Keith DeVries (1937–2006) – American archaeologist
 Kelly DeVries (born 1956) – American medievalist historian
 Marc de Vries (born 1958) – Dutch physicist
 Margaret Garritsen de Vries (1922–2009) – American economist
 Philip James DeVries (born 1952) – American entomologist and evolutionary ecologist
 Rheta Devries (1936–2012) – American educator
 Ronald P. de Vries (born 196?); mycologist
 Susanna de Vries (born 1936) – Australian historian

Arts, acting, music
 Abraham de Vries (painter) (c. 1590 – 1649/50) – Dutch portrait painter
 Adriaen de Vries (1556–1626) – Dutch sculptor
 Andrew DeVries (born 1957) – American painter and sculptor
 Bouke de Vries (born 1960) – Dutch ceramist in England
 Casper de Vries (born 1964) – South African comedian
 David Devriès (1881–1936) – French lyric operatic tenor
 David de Vries (born 1961) – Australian film and comic book maker
 Dolf de Vries (1937–2020) – Dutch actor
 Doug de Vries (born 1960) – Australian guitarist
 Erwin de Vries (1929–2018) – Surinamese painter and sculptor
 Han de Vries (born 1941) – Dutch oboist
 Hendrik de Vries (1896–1989) – Dutch poet and painter
 Henri De Vries (1864–1949) – Dutch film actor
 Herman de Vries (born 1931) – Dutch artist
 Jill De Vries (born 1953) – American model
 John DeVries (1915–1992) – American lyricist
 John de Vries (born 1946) – Dutch car designer
 Klaas de Vries (composer) (born 1944) – Dutch composer
 Leondre Devries (born 2000) – British pop singer
 Louis de Vries (1905–1935) – Dutch jazz trumpeter
 Marius De Vries (born 1961) – English music producer
 Matt DeVries (born 1977) – American guitarist
 Nathalie de Vries (born 1965) – Dutch architect
 Roelof de Vries (1631 – c. 1690) – Dutch landscape painter
 Rosa de Vries-van Os (1828–1889) – Dutch operatic singer
 Simon de Vries (1570–75 – 1628/29) – Dutch engraver better known as Frisius

Politics and religion
 Abraham de Vries (minister) (1773–1862) – Dutch Mennonite minister
 Albert de Vries (born 1955) – Dutch politician
 Aukje de Vries (born 1964) – Dutch politician
 Bert de Vries (born 1938) – Dutch CDA politician
 Betsi DeVries (born 1952) – American (New Hampshire) politician
 Bibi de Vries (born 1963) – Dutch VVD politician
 Christoph de Vries (born 1974), German politician
 Cornelis de Vries (1740–1812) – Dutch Mennonite minister
 George Devries (1896–1957) –  Australian (Queensland) politician
 Gerrit de Vries (politician) (1818–1900) – Dutch prime minister
 Gijs de Vries (born 1956) – Dutch politician
 Henry Lucien de Vries (1909–1987) – Surinamese politician and entrepreneur
 Jack de Vries (born 1968) – Dutch CDA politician
 Jannewietske de Vries (born 1961) – Dutch (Friesland) politician
 John Devries (Yukon politician) (born 1945) – Canadian (Yukon) politician
 Kees de Vries (born 1955), German/Dutch politician (CDU)
 Klaas de Vries (Christian Democratic Appeal) (1917–1999) –  Dutch politician
 Klaas de Vries (Labour Party) (born 1943) – Dutch politician
 Marion De Vries (1865–1939) – American politician
 Monique de Vries (born 1947) – Dutch VVD politician
 Walter DeVries (1929–2019) – American political consultant

Sports
 Alida de Vries (1914–2007) – Dutch sprinter
 Anita Valen de Vries (born 1968), Norwegian racing cyclist
 Ann Devries (born 1970) – Belgian tennis player
 Berden de Vries (born 1989) – Dutch racing cyclist
 Bob de Vries (born 1984) – Dutch speed skater
 Carl E. DeVries (1921–2010) – American football coach
 Cole De Vries (born 1985) – American baseball pitcher
 Darian DeVries (born 1975) – American basketball coach
 Dorien de Vries (born 1965) – Dutch competitive sailor
 Dorus de Vries (born 1980) – Dutch football goalkeeper
 Douwe de Vries (born 1982) – Dutch speed skater
 Elma de Vries (born 1983) – Dutch speed skater
 Feike de Vries (born 1943) – Dutch water polo player
 Floris de Vries (born 1989) – Dutch golfer
 Francis de Vries (born 1994) – New Zealand footballer
 François De Vries (1913–1972) – Belgian footballer
 Gerrit de Vries (cyclist) (born 1967) – Dutch road cyclist
 Greg de Vries (born 1973) – Canadian hockey player
 Jack de Vries (soccer) (born 2002) – American soccer player
 Jan de Vries (athlete) (1896–1939) – Dutch sprinter
 Jan de Vries (motorcyclist) (born 1944) – Dutch motorcycle road racer
 Jan-Lodewijk de Vries (born 1972) – Dutch water polo player
 Jared DeVries (born 1976) – American football player
 Jeroen de Vries (born 1971) – Dutch speed skater
 John de Vries (born 1966) – Australian racecar driver
 Johnny de Vries (born 1990) – Dutch footballer
 Kristi de Vries (born 1982) – Dutch softball player
 Lianne de Vries (born 1990) – Dutch footballer
 Linda de Vries (born 1988) – Dutch speed skater
 Marijn de Vries (born 1978) – Dutch racing cyclist and journalist
 Mark de Vries (born 1975) – Dutch footballer
 Martijn de Vries (born 1992) – Dutch footballer
 Martin de Vries (born 1960) – Dutch basketball player
 Mered de Vries (born 1977) – Dutch volleyballer
 Michelle de Vries (born 1961) – Australian swimmer
 Myles de Vries (born 1940) – English cricketer
 Nyck de Vries (born 1995) – Dutch racing driver
 Paul de Vries (born 1996) – Ghanaian footballer
 Raimo de Vries (born 1969) – Dutch footballer
 Remon de Vries (born 1979) – Dutch footballer
 Rianne de Vries (born 1990) – Dutch speed skater
 Rika de Vries (born 1974) – Dutch sitting volleyball player
 Ruan de Vries (born 1986)] – South African hurdler
 Ryan De Vries (born 1992) – New Zealand footballer
 Sjerstin de Vries-Vermeulen (born 1972/73) – Dutch swimmer and equestrian
 Steve DeVries (born 1964) –  American tennis player
 Tjark de Vries (born 1965) – Dutch rower
 Troy DeVries (born 1982) – American basketball player
 Vikki de Vries (born 1964) – American figure skater
 Vincent de Vries (born 1994) – Dutch badminton player

Writing and journalism
 Abe de Vries (born 1965) – Dutch West Frisian-language writer and poet
 Abraham H. de Vries (born 1937) – Afrikaans author
 Anke de Vries (born 1936) – Dutch youth writer
 Anne de Vries (1904–1964) – Dutch author
 Maggie De Vries (born 1961) – Canadian writer
 Peter De Vries (1910–1993) – American editor and comic novelist
 Peter R. de Vries (1956–2021) – Dutch journalist
 Rachel Guido deVries (born 1947) – American poet and novelist
 Stefan de Vries (born 1970) –  Dutch writer and journalist
 Theun de Vries (1907–2005) – Dutch writer and poet

Other
 David Pietersz. de Vries (c. 1593 – 1665) – Dutch navigator and New Netherland patroon
 Glen de Vries (1972–2021) – American businessman
 Hidde Sjoerds de Vries (1645–1694)— Dutch admiral
 Jan de Vries (soldier) (1924–2012) – Canadian veteran's advocate
 Lini De Vries (1905–1982) – Dutch-born American public health nurse in Mexico
 Maarten Gerritsz Vries (or "de Vries") (1589–1647) – Dutch cartographer and explorer
 Mike de Vries (born 1958) – German businessman
 Nina de Vries (born 1961) – Dutch sex worker
 Roel de Vries (born 1968) – Dutch engineer and businessman in Japan
 Roland de Vries – South African Army officer
 Tara De Vries (born 1999) – Turkish-Dutch beauty pageant
 Tjerk Hiddes de Vries (1622–1666) –  Dutch admiral and naval hero
 William DeVries (born 1943) – American surgeon who performed first permanent artificial heart transplant

Compound surnames
 Manfred F.R. Kets de Vries (born 1943) – Dutch author and researcher
 Daniel Rooseboom de Vries (born 1980) – Dutch freestyle footballer 
 Hans Vredeman de Vries (1527–1607) – Dutch architect
 Jacob Vredeman de Vries (1588–1621) – Dutch kapellmeister and composer
 Paul Vredeman de Vries (1567–1617) – Flemish painter and draughtsman
 Salomon Vredeman de Vries (1556–1604) – Flemish painter and draughtsman
 Herman de Vries de Heekelingen (1880–1942) – Dutch archaeologist and historian
 Gerard de Vries Lentsch (1883–1973) – Dutch competitive sailor
 Willem de Vries Lentsch (1886–1980) – Dutch competitive sailor
 Wim de Vries Lentsch (1914–2007) – Dutch competitive sailor
 Hans Dirk de Vries Reilingh (1908–2001) – Dutch geographer
 Boyd van der Vuurst de Vries (born 1999) – Dutch basketball player
 Keye van der Vuurst de Vries (born 2001) – Dutch basketball player
 Piet van Wyk de Vries (born 1972) – South African songwriter

Fictional people
 Alicia DeVries – drop commando and captain of the alpha synth starship Megaera from the novel Path of the Fury by David Weber
 Cassandra de Vries – director of the dataDyne corporation from the Perfect Dark video game series
 Hugo De Vries —an adversary of Inspector Morse, featured in the episode Masonic Mysteries
 Piter De Vries – a twisted Mentat in the 1965 novel Dune
 Tissaia de Vries – a sorceress in The Witcher series

See also
 Vries (surname), list of people with the similar surname
 Devriès family, a family of American and later French operatic singers, descendants of Rosa de Vries-van Os
 Korteweg–de Vries equation, a wave model co-discovered by Gustav de Vries
 Tussenvoegsel, the prepositions and/or articles in Dutch surnames

References

Dutch-language surnames
Afrikaans-language surnames
Surnames of Frisian origin
Ethnonymic surnames